Sarah-Jayne Gratton, née Camden (born 1966 in Cambridge, England) is a producer, author and a former theatre performer.

Early life
Gratton attended the Shrubbery school and the King Slocombe Stage school in Cambridge, which led to her appearance on BBC Look East, a regional television talent show in the late 1970s. From there, Gratton went on to perform at the Cambridge Arts Theatre, the Prince of Wales Theatre, London and Caesar's Palace, Luton in the early 1980s.

A former actress, Gratton was a columnist for Women's Business Magazine (Teallach Publications Ltd.) in the late 1990s and was elected as President of the Women in Business Society for both UK and Europe in 2000.

Current activities
Gratton has since become an influential social media persona, speaker and writer, being regularly featured in Social Media Today and other publications including In-Spires Lifestyle Magazine and blogcritics.org.

Personal life
Gratton is married to the author and columnist Dean Anthony Gratton.

List of works
Follow Me! Creating a Personal Brand with Twitter, John Wiley & Sons, 2012
Zero to 100,000: Social Media Tips and Tricks for Small Businesses, Que (an imprint of Pearson Education), 2011
Marketing Wireless Products, Butterworth–Heinemann (an imprint of Elsevier), 2004

References

External links
Official website

1966 births
Living people
British writers
English writers
People from Cambridge
English women writers